Dinothenarus is a genus of beetles belonging to the family Staphylinidae.

The species of this genus are found in Europe and Northern America.

Species:
 Dinothenarus amisadaiae Santiago-Jiménez, 2008 
 Dinothenarus arrosus (Eppelsheim, 1890)

References

Staphylinidae
Staphylinidae genera